Cesaspheniscus debskii is a species of tephritid or fruit flies in the genus Cesaspheniscus of the family Tephritidae.

Distribution
Egypt, Israel.

References

Tephritinae
Insects described in 1924
Diptera of Asia
Diptera of Africa